Saugnac-et-Muret (before 2022: Saugnacq-et-Muret) is a commune in the Landes department in Nouvelle-Aquitaine in southwestern France.

Population

See also
Communes of the Landes department
Parc naturel régional des Landes de Gascogne

References

Communes of Landes (department)